The Captain and Me is the third studio album by American rock band The Doobie Brothers. The album was released on March 2, 1973, by Warner Bros. Records. It features some of their most popular hits including "Long Train Runnin'", "China Grove" and "Without You". The album is certified 2× Platinum by the RIAA.

It was voted number 835 in the third edition of Colin Larkin's All Time Top 1000 Albums (2000).

Recording and content
There was pressure on the band to move quickly and to save time they began reworking old tunes. One of Tom Johnston's songs, "Osborn", had been an improvisational piece that the band played live. After laying down the track, according to producer Ted Templeman, "We still really didn't have it, and I said, 'Make it about a train, since you have this thing about 'Miss Lucy down along the track.' So he came up with "Long Train Runnin'."

Synthesizers and strings were brought in to record The Captain and Me. Synth programmers Malcolm Cecil and Robert Margouleff were brought in to engineer the opening track, "Natural Thing". Striving for a synthesized sound like that of The Beatles' "Being for the Benefit of Mr. Kite!", they would overdub individual notes to create chords for the song's bridge.

"Dark Eyed Cajun Woman" was a bluesy track (one of the band's earliest) and seen by Johnston as a tribute to the blues and B.B. King. "South City Midnight Lady", while being about South San Francisco, is not about any woman in particular. Jeff Baxter of Steely Dan played pedal steel guitar on the track. He would become an official Doobie Brother in 1974. Cecil and Margouleff also added the synthesized effect of a woman whispering at the end.

"Clear as the Driven Snow", according to Johnston, is a warning about recreational chemical abuse, which reflected the band members' lifestyles at that time.

The second side of the album opens with the rocker "Without You". This song, like many others, had begun as a jam. "That song had both drummers playing at the same time," Johnston stated. "It was kind of a tribute to The Who. We did it in concert for quite a while."

Patrick Simmons' short solo guitar piece "Busted Down Around O'Connelley Corners" segues into "Ukiah", which Johnston wrote in tribute to the area. Johnston said, "We played a few shows in Ukiah, and I used to camp out a lot in the area when I was going to college." The song's back-to-the-land sentiments also reflected some of his feelings at the time, although he admitted he probably couldn't make it as a farmer. This track segues into the album closer and title track, "The Captain and Me". According to Johnston,  the captain is no one in particular and the lyrics were written at the last minute and have no real meaning. The song was released as a single in the Netherlands and received some airplay there.  Ron Blomberg recalled he and Yankee captain Thurman Munson liking the song for its positive message "about people coming together to change things for the better," describing the song as having "pretty cosmic" words, and named his book about Munson after this song.

Surround releases
The album was originally released in Quadraphonic sound on the CD-4 Quadradisc system and also on Quadraphonic 8-track tape. The album was also released in 2002 remixed into 5.1 multichannel DVD-Audio, and on 14 September 2011, on hybrid stereo-multichannel Super Audio CD by Warner Japan in their Warner Premium Sound series.

Artwork
The artwork found on the front and back of the album features the band, including manager Bruce Cohn, dressed in 19th century western garments and riding a horse-drawn stagecoach beneath an unfinished modern freeway overpass. "All that stuff came from the Warner Bros. film studios lot," Tom Johnston said. "It must've been a lot of work for the guys who brought up the horse team and the carriage and the clothes. It was fun to do—they had coffins out there, all kinds of crazy stuff." The photography was done by Michael and Jill Maggid. The setting for the cover was located at the Newhall Pass interchange of the Interstate 5 and California State Route 14 freeways near Sylmar, California that collapsed during the 1971 San Fernando earthquake. This same section of freeway would collapse again during the 1994 Northridge earthquake.

Track listing

Personnel
The Doobie Brothers:
 Tom Johnston – acoustic and electric guitars, harmonica on "Long Train Runnin'", ARP synthesizer, lead and backing vocals
 Patrick Simmons – acoustic and electric guitars, ARP synthesizer, banjo on "The Captain and Me", lead and backing vocals
 Tiran Porter – bass, backing vocals
 John Hartman – drums, percussion, backing vocals
 Michael Hossack – drums, congas, timbales

Additional players:
 Bill Payne – piano on "China Grove", "South City Midnight Lady" and "Ukiah", organ on "Without You", electric piano on "Dark Eyed Cajun Woman"
 Jeffrey 'Skunk' Baxter – pedal steel guitar on "South City Midnight Lady"
 Ted Templeman – percussion, backing vocals on "Without You"
 Nick DeCaro – string arrangements on "Dark Eyed Cajun Woman", "South City Midnight Lady" and "Evil Woman"
 Malcolm Cecil, Robert Margouleff – ARP synthesizer programming on "Natural Thing", "Clear as the Driven Snow", "South City Midnight Lady" and "Ukiah"

Production
 Producer: Ted Templeman
 Production Coordination: Benita Brazier
 Engineer: Donn Landee
 Design: John Casado, Barbara Casado
 Photography: Michael Maggid, Jill Maggid
 Art Direction: Ed Thrasher

Charts

Certifications

References

Notes

 

1973 albums
The Doobie Brothers albums
Albums produced by Ted Templeman
Warner Records albums